Margarita Sánchez De León (born ca. 1956) is a Puerto Rican minister and activist for human rights and LGBT rights. She is a Stonewall Award laureate of the Anderson Prize Foundation.

Biography
The University of Puerto Rico awarded her a bachelor's degree in Art and Literature, while the Evangelical Seminary of Puerto Rico awarded her a master's degree in Religion. Sánchez De León also completed coursework towards a Ph.D. while a student at the Graduate Theological Foundation. In addition to Spanish, Sánchez De León speaks English and Portuguese. She served as pastor for Metropolitan Community Church congregations in San Juan, Puerto Rico, London, and currently lives in Lisbon, Portugal. Sanchez De Leon also served as Executive Director of Amnesty International, Section of Puerto Rico. She married Frida Kruijt and they are parents of twins. At the age of 42, she was a 1998 Stonewall Award laureate of the Anderson Prize Foundation.

References

Bibliography
 

1956 births
Living people
Amnesty International people
American human rights activists
LGBT Protestant clergy
American LGBT rights activists
Puerto Rican LGBT people
People from Lisbon
20th-century Puerto Rican women
University of Puerto Rico alumni
21st-century Puerto Rican women
American expatriates in Portugal
20th-century Protestant religious leaders
Women Christian clergy
21st-century Protestant religious leaders
Puerto Rican Protestants
Graduate Theological Foundation alumni
Women civil rights activists